The Northern Regnitz is a river in Bavaria, Germany. It flows into the Saale northwest of Hof.

See also
List of rivers of Bavaria

References

Rivers of Bavaria
Rivers of Germany